Eagles RFC is a Finnish rugby club in Turku.

External links
Eagles RFC

Finnish rugby union teams
Rugby clubs established in 2002
2002 establishments in Finland
Sport in Turku